The 1869 Princeton Tigers football team represented the College of New Jersey, more commonly known as Princeton College, in the 1869 college football season. The team finished with a 1–1 record and was retroactively named national champions by the Billingsley Report and National Championship Foundation, and as the co-national champions by Parke H. Davis. Princeton's first captain was William S. Gummere, who was 17 during the season.

On November 6, the team played at Rutgers in what has been called the first intercollegiate American football game. Rutgers won the game 6–4, which was played using rules adapted from the Football Association rules of the time, which more closely resembled soccer than current American football. Rutgers traveled to Princeton the next week to play under Princeton's rules, the Tigers won 8–0.

Schedule

See also
 List of historically significant college football games
 List of the first college football games in each U.S. state

References

Princeton
Princeton Tigers football seasons
College football national champions
College soccer national championship-winning seasons (1866–1904)
Princeton Tigers football